Youzi may refer to:

Pomelo a large citrus fruit native to Asia, known as 'Youzi' （柚子） in Chinese
You Ruo, also known by the name 'Youzi' (有子）, a disciple of Confucius